Ştefan Pongratz (born 17 August 1930) is a Romanian rower. He competed at the 1952 Summer Olympics in Helsinki with the men's eight where they were eliminated in the round one repêchage.

References

External links
 

1930 births
Possibly living people
Romanian male rowers
Olympic rowers of Romania
Rowers at the 1952 Summer Olympics
Rowers at the 1960 Summer Olympics
Rowers at the 1964 Summer Olympics
Sportspeople from Arad
European Rowing Championships medalists